Pogonortalis doclea, the boatman fly, is a species of signal fly (family Platystomatidae). It is native to Australia and has been introduced to California in the United States.

Description 
Characteristics of the genus Pogonortalis are: the cheek immediately below the eye being less than a tenth the height of the eye; the hind femur having an anteroventral keel at the distal third; and the anterior crossvein of the wing meeting vein 4 before the mid-length of the discal cell.

Pogonortalis doclea is sexually dimorphic. Males have a bundle of long curved bristles on each cheek of the head. In this location, females have a single shorter bristle among small hairs. Larger males also have the head ventrally widened.

Behaviour 
This species waves its wings like the rowing of oars on a boat, thus the common name "boatman fly".

Pogonortalis doclea is commonly found in Australian gardens. Adults are attracted to and feed on the fresh dung of mammals.

Males engage each other in face-to-face pushing contests.

References

External links

 

Platystomatidae
Articles created by Qbugbot
Insects described in 1849
Taxa named by Francis Walker (entomologist)